The twenty-third edition of the ATP Masters Series. The champion of each Masters event is awarded a 1,000 rankings points.

Tournaments

Results

Tournament details

Indian Wells Masters

Singles

Doubles

Miami Open

Singles

Doubles

Monte-Carlo Masters

Singles

Doubles

Madrid Open

Singles

Doubles

Italian Open

Singles

Doubles

Canadian Open

Singles

Doubles

Cincinnati Masters

Singles

Doubles

Shanghai Masters

Singles

Doubles

Paris Masters

Singles

Doubles

See also 
 ATP Tour Masters 1000
 2012 ATP Tour
 2012 WTA Premier Mandatory and Premier 5 tournaments
 2012 WTA Tour

References

External links 
Association of Tennis Professionals (ATP) official website
International Tennis Federation (ITF) official website

ATP Tour Masters 1000